A horizontal boring machine or horizontal boring mill is a machine tool which bores holes in a horizontal direction.  There are three main types — table, planer and floor.  The table type is the most common and, as it is the most versatile, it is also known as the universal type.

A horizontal boring machine has its work spindle parallel to the ground and work table. Typically there are three linear axes in which the tool head and part move. Convention dictates that the main axis that drives the part towards the work spindle is the Z axis, with a cross-traversing X axis and a vertically traversing Y axis. The work spindle is referred to as the C axis and, if a rotary table is incorporated, its centre line is the B axis.                   

Horizontal boring machines are often heavy-duty industrial machines used for roughing out large components, but there are high-precision models too.  Modern machines use advanced computer numerical control (CNC) systems and techniques. Charles DeVlieg entered the Machine Tool Hall of Fame for his work upon a highly precise model, which he called a JIGMIL. The accuracy of this machine convinced the United States Air Force to accept John Parson's idea for numerically controlled machine tools.

References

Machine tools